Chan Yung-jan and Chuang Chia-jung were the defending champions, but Chan chose not to compete that year.Chuang partnered with Yan Zi, and they won in the final, 6–0, 4–6, [10–7], against Maria Kirilenko and Agnieszka Radwańska.

Seeds

Draw

Draw

LA Women's Tennis Championships - Doubles
LA Women's Tennis Championships - Doubles
LA Women's Tennis Championships